Asselar man is a Later Stone Age skeleton discovered by Theodore Monod and Wladimir Besnard (in various sources incorrectly named M.M. Besnard or M.V. Besnard) in 1927, in the Adrar des Ifoghas. The massif is located near Essouk in what is now the Kidal Region of Mali. Wickliffe Draper funded the expedition.

The Asselar specimen has been dated to around 6,400 BP, making it no older than the Holocene. Along with such fossils as Iwo Eleru (11,000 BP) and Ishango (8,000 BP), which were excavated from archaeological sites in West and Central Africa, Asselar is one of the earliest known anatomically modern human skeletons, with negroid phenotype, living in sub Saharan Africa. Older fossils with a similar morphology have also been found near Khartoum, dated to between 8,000 and 5,000 BC.

Due there being no specific publication or reference found in and among existing academic literature, beyond simple mention (e.g., Cheikh Anta Diop in 1968), which provides contextualizing explanation for the dating of the Asselar remains at 6390 BP, as well as the absence of data on the femur used to generate the date and the degree of error that 1960s-era carbon-14 dating methods can produce, the date of 6390 BP provided for the Asselar remains is regarded as meriting caution in its consideration and use. More recently, in the 1980s, geological dating from the Asselar site in the Saharan region of northern Mali has produced a date for the Asselar remains as being between 9500 BP and 7000 BP, amid the early Holocene Wet Phase.

The Asselar individual was found near what, during the time of the African Humid Period, was likely a lake. Medical imaging techniques of the skeleton and surrounding matrix show that the Asselar individual was likely intentionally buried, rather than having been drowned and subsequently buried by accident as originally thought. Human remains found buried in similar anatomical positions have been found at other early Holocene sites such as Hassi-el-Abiod in Mali.

See also
List of human evolution fossils

References

This article began as a translation of the corresponding article in the French Wikipedia, Retrieved 17 December 2005.

External links
 Encyclopædia Britannica: Asselar man entry
 Human Timeline (Interactive) – Smithsonian, National Museum of Natural History (August 2016).

Human remains (archaeological)
History of Mali